Norway competed at the 1920 Summer Olympics in Antwerp, Belgium. 194 competitors, 188 men and 6 women, took part in 72 events in 16 sports.

Medalists

Gold
 Helge Løvland — Athletics, Men's Decathlon
 Erik Herseth, Sigurd Holter, Ingar Nielsen, Ole Sørensen, Petter Jamvold, Gunnar Jamvold and Claus Juell — Sailing, Men's 10 metre class (1907 rating)
 Charles Arentz, Willy Gilbert, Robert Giertsen, Arne Sejersted, Halfdan Schjøtt, Trygve Schjøtt and Otto Falkenberg — Sailing, Men's 10 metre class (1919 rating)
 Henrik Østervold, Jan Østervold, Ole Østervold, Hans Næss, Halvor Møgster, Halvor Birkeland, Rasmus Birkeland, Kristian Østervold and Lauritz Christiansen — Sailing, Men's 12 metre class (1907 rating)
 Johan Friele, Olaf Ørvig, Arthur Allers, Christen Wiese, Martin Borthen, Egill Reimers, Kaspar Hassel, Thor Ørvig and Erik Ørvig — Sailing, Men's 12 metre class (1919 rating)
 Andreas Brecke, Paal Kaasen and Ingolf Rød — Sailing, Men's 6 metre class (1919 rating)
 Carl Ringvold, Thorleif Holbye, Tellef Wagle, Kristoffer Olsen and Alf Jacobsen — Sailing, Men's 8 metre class (1907 rating)
 Magnus Konow, Reidar Marthiniussen, Ragnar Vik and Thorleif Christoffersen — Sailing, Men's 8 metre class (1919 rating)
 Ole Lilloe-Olsen — Shooting, Men's 100m running deer, double shots
 Harald Natvig, Ole Lilloe-Olsen, Einar Liberg, Hans Nordvik and Thorstein Johansen — Shooting, Men's Team 100m running deer, double shots
 Otto Olsen — Shooting, Men's 100m running deer, single shot
 Harald Natvig, Otto Olsen, Ole Lilloe-Olsen, Einar Liberg and Hans Nordvik — Shooting, Men's Team 100m running deer, single shot
 Otto Olsen — Shooting, Men's 300m military rifle, prone

Silver
 Sverre Sørsdal — Boxing, Light-Heavyweight
 Andreas Krogh — Figure skating, Men's singles
 Alexia Bryn and Yngvar Bryn — Figure skating, Pairs
 Men's Team — Gymnastics
 Einar Torgersen, Andreas Knudsen and Leif Erichsen — Sailing, Men's 6 metre class (1907 rating)
 Christian Dick, Sten Abel, Niels Nielsen and Johann Faye — Sailing, Men's 7 metre class
 Jens Salvesen, Lauritz Schmidt, Finn Schiander, Nils Thomas and Ralph Tschudi — Sailing, Men's 8 metre class (1919 rating)
 Otto Olsen, Albert Helgerud, Olaf Sletten, Østen Østensen and Jacob Onsrud — Shooting, Men's Team military rifle, 300m + 600m
 Østen Østensen, Otto Olsen, Olaf Sletten, Gudbrand Skatteboe and Harald Natvig — Shooting, Men's Team free rifle
 Holger Sinding-Larsen

Bronze
 Martin Stixrud — Figure skating, Men's singles
 Tollef Tollefsen, Thoralf Hagen, Theodor Nag, Conrad Olsen, Adolf Nilsen, Håkon Ellingsen, Thore Michelsen, Arne Mortensen and Karl Nag — Rowing, Men's eight (8+)
 Birger Var, Theodor Klem, Henry Larsen, Per Gulbrandsen and Thoralf Hagen — Rowing, Men's four with coxswain (4+)
 Henrik Agersborg, Trygve Pedersen and Einar Berntsen — Sailing, Men's 6 metre class (1907 rating)
 Einar Liberg — Shooting, Men's 100m running deer, double shots
 Harald Natvig — Shooting, Men's 100m running deer, single shot
 Østen Østensen — Shooting, Men's 300m free rifle, 3 positions
 Østen Østensen, Olaf Sletten, Anton Olsen, Sigvart Johansen and Albert Helgerud — Shooting, Men's Team 50m small bore rifle
 Frithjof Andersen — Wrestling, Greco-Roman lightweight

Aquatics

Diving

Four divers, two men and two women, represented Norway in 1920. It was the nation's second appearance in the sport. As in 1912, no Norwegian diver advanced to the final. Larsen came closest, placing fourth in her 10-metre platform semifinal; a top three finish was required to advance in all events.

 Men

Ranks given are within the semifinal group.

 Women

Ranks given are within the semifinal group.

Swimming

Two swimmers, both men, represented Norway in 1920. It was the nation's second appearance in the sport. Neither swimmer advanced past the first round in any of their events.

Ranks given are within the heat.

 Men

Athletics

16 athletes represented Norway in the nation's independent Olympic debut in 1920. It was the nation's fourth appearance in athletics, a sport in which Norway had competed each time the country had appeared at the Olympics. Løvland won Norway's only athletics medal, taking the gold in the decathlon.

Ranks given are within the heat.

Boxing 

14 boxers represented Norway at the 1920 Games. It was the nation's debut in boxing. Sørsdal won the nation's first Olympic boxing medal with a silver in the light heavyweight class.

Cycling

Four cyclists represented Norway in 1920. It was the nation's second appearance in the sport. All four competed in the road time trial, with Flatby coming in 28th to be the best Norwegian cyclist at the Games. The team came in eighth overall in combined time.

Road cycling

Equestrian

Football

Norway competed in the Olympic football tournament for the second time. The country's first Olympic victory was a stunning 3–1 win over Great Britain, the previously undefeated winner of three gold medals in three attempts. It would also turn out to be Norway's only victory in 1920, as the team was defeated by Czechoslovakia in the quarterfinals and by Italy in the first round of the consolation tournament.

 First round

 Quarterfinals

 Consolation first round

Final rank 8th

Gymnastics

Twenty-six gymnasts represented Norway in 1920. It was the nation's third appearance in the sport. Norway entered a team in the free system competition; competing against only Denmark, the Norwegians took second place and the silver medal. Hol was the only gymnast to enter the individual competition, placing fourteenth of twenty-five.

Artistic gymnastics

Modern pentathlon

Two pentathletes represented Norway in 1920. It was the nation's second appearance in the sport, having competed at both instances of the Olympic modern pentathlon.

A point-for-place system was used, with the lowest total score winning.

Rowing

Thirteen rowers represented Norway in 1920. It was the nation's third appearance in the sport. Both boats earned bronze medals, matching the nation's best results to that time. The coxed fours boat took third place in the final, while the eights team earned their bronze as the best of two losing semifinalists.

Ranks given are within the heat.

Sailing

Fifty-nine sailors represented Norway in 1920, by far the most of any country (Belgium was next, with fourteen). It was the nation's third appearance in the sport. Norway took seven gold medals (five uncontested), three silvers, and a bronze.

Skating

Figure skating

Six figure skaters represented Norway in 1920. It was the nation's debut in the sport. The Norwegian skaters took three medals in the men's singles and the pairs, but finished without a gold medal.

Shooting

Sixteen shooters represented Norway in 1920. It was the nation's fourth appearance in the sport as well as the Olympics. Norway took all four gold medals in the running deer events. Lilloe-Olsen was on both of the gold medal teams, as well as taking the individual gold in the double shots version. Otto Olsen was on the single shots team, took gold in the individual version of that event, and added a third gold in the prone 300 metre military rifle as well as being on two silver medal rifle teams. In all, the nation won 11 medals, more than any other country except the United States.

Tennis

Three tennis players, two men and a woman, competed for Norway in 1920. It was the nation's second appearance in the sport. Each of the three players lost their first singles match. The men, playing as a pair, won a single match to advance to the quarterfinals before being defeated.

Wrestling

Seven wrestlers competed for Norway in 1920. It was the nation's third appearance in the sport. Andersen was the only medalist, taking a bronze in the Greco-Roman lightweight. Johnsen almost added another in the middleweight, but lost the bronze medal match to finish fourth.

Freestyle

Greco-Roman

Art Competitions

References

External links
 
 
 International Olympic Committee results database

Nations at the 1920 Summer Olympics
1920
Olympics